Farangis Nurulla-Khoja (born 1972) is a Tajik-Canadian composer, who explores timbre within her contemporary compositions of symphonic, chamber, vocal, and electro-acoustic music.  Among her many honors is a Guggenheim Fellowship Award in Composition in 2018.

Life 
Farangis Nurulla-Khoja currently resides in Montréal, Quebec, but was born in Dushanbe, Tajikistan  and is related to the well-known Tajik composer, Ziyodullo Shahidi. She not only earned a Ph.D. of Fine Arts in Composition (2004) from University of Göteborg, Sweden, but has also studied at the University of California in San Diego as well as at IRCAM in Paris. Her early education was in piano at the Ziyodullo Shahidi Special Music School (1979-1990). In addition, she was a researcher in ethnomusicology at the Pitt Rivers Museum in Oxford (1992-1993) where she studied both Tajik and Chinese music traditions.

Nurulla-Khoja has studied with an international array of composers from Ole Lützow-Holm (b. 1954) to Roger Reynolds (b. 1934) and from Brian Ferneyhough (b. 1943) to Philippe Leroux (b. 1953).  She was composer in residence at Fondation Royaumont (2005–06), working on the project Maqam et Créations; at the Bellagio Center of the Rockefeller Foundation (2010) in Italy; and at the Experimental Studio (2010–11) in Freiburg, Germany.

Nurulla-Khoja's compositional output has been heard around the world. She employs a contemporary musical aesthetic drawn from both Asian and European sources across symphonic, chamber, film, vocal, and electro-acoustic music genres. Her compositional palette melds microtonal, tone clusters, and sharp melodic elements. Dance and poetry are active participants in her compositional process. Her works have been performed by many notable ensembles, such as:
ICTUS (Belgium)
 Avanti! (Finland)
Neue Vocalsolisten Stuttgart (New Music Festival, Germany)
 Ziggurat (International Gaudeamus Music Week, Holland)
 New Juilliard Chamber Ensemble (NY, NY)
 Turning Point Ensemble (Vancouver, Canada)
 Gothenburg Symphony
 Shanghai Symphony Orchestra (Shanghai, China)
 Montpellier Symphony Orchestra (Montpellier, France)
 Oslo Sinfonietta (Oslo, Norway)
 Oviedo National Orchestra (Oviedo, Spain)
 Bienne Solar Symphony Orchestra-Orchestre Syphonique Bienne Soleure (Bienne, Switzerland)
 Winnipeg Symphony Orchestra (Winnipeg, Canada)
 Rubinstein Symphony Orchestra,  (Lodz, Poland)
 Ensemble Transmission (Montréal, Canada)
 Continuum ensemble (NYC, US)

Selected works 

1. “Daidu”
Concerto for violin, string orchestra, and three percussion instruments
Won 2nd Prize at the Grazyna Bacewicz International Composer Competition in Lodz, Pologne in 2015
Running 18:46
“Daidu” is a 21st-century, polytonal work that contains clear motivic elements echoed between solo violin and orchestra. It has jarring rhythms and quick, ascending chromatic scales, which interplay with sudden dissonant tones held in one long bow stroke. It is atmospheric, especially when the percussion accompanies the solo violin passages. 
Listen at > https://soundcloud.com/farangisnurulla/daidu 

2.	“Gusto”
Form unknown, written for large chamber ensemble
Commissioned and premiered by Kammarensemblen during the Stockholm New Music Festival, with the support of the Swedish Art Council
Composed in 2012
Running 9:32
“Gusto” is 21st century, polytonal work that contains sliding ascending and descending chromatic scales, increasing and decreasing forcefully in volume throughout the piece. It requires that instruments should be played at the farthest extensions of their ranges. Throughout the pronounced sliding scales, short melodies can be heard, especially in the violins.
Listen at > https://www.youtube.com/watch?v=mrWERfSbenM

For a complete list, see Farangis Nurulla-Khoja's website (http://farangis-nurulla.com/works/)

Honors 
 2000 - Grand Prize for “Replica” from Abu Gazali Foundation in Salzburg, Austria  
 2008 - Best Mid-Career Composer from Canada Arts Council's Joseph S. Stauffer Prize for the Arts  
 2010 - Composition Prize for “Parparon” Third Magistralia Competition for Composers in Oviedo, Spain  
 2012 - STIM-Stipendium Award
 2014 - Awarded 3rd Prize for “Ravishi Nur” - concerto for saxophone and orchestra for Andrey Petrov Composers Competition in Saint Petersburg, Russia
 2015 - Awarded 2nd Prize for “Daidu” - concerto for violin, string orchestra, and three percussion instruments for Grazyna Bacewicz International Composer Competition in Lodz, Pologne
 2016 - Composition Prize (placement is unknown) for “L’infini de l’instant” in Andrey Petrov Composers Competition in Saint Petersburg, Russia  
 2016 - Prize of Recognition from Longueuil Art Council 
 2017 - Gold Medal “Best of Show” for “Incandescence” for Global Music Awards
 2018 - Guggenheim Fellowship Award in Composition from John Simon Guggenheim Foundation

References

External links 
 Personal website: http://farangis-nurulla.com/works/
 SoundCloud channel: https://soundcloud.com/farangisnurulla
 YouTube Search for "Farangis Nurulla-Khoja": https://www.youtube.com/results?search_query=farangis+nurulla-khoja

Women classical composers
Electroacoustic music composers
21st-century classical composers
People from Dushanbe
University of Gothenburg alumni
University of California, San Diego alumni
Tajikistani emigrants
People from Longueuil
Canadian classical composers
Tajikistani composers
1972 births
Living people
21st-century women composers
Canadian women composers